Matylda Getter (1870–1968) was a Polish Catholic nun, mother provincial of CSFFM (lat. Congregatio Sororum Franciscalium Familiae Mariae) - Franciscan Sisters of the Family of Mary in Warsaw and social worker in pre-war Poland. In German-occupied Warsaw during World War II she cooperated with Irena Sendler and the Żegota resistance organization in saving the lives of hundreds of Jewish children from the Warsaw Ghetto. She was recognized as one of Polish Righteous among the Nations by Yad Vashem. for her rescue activities.

Biography
She started social work before World War II and she received a number of the highest national distinctions in honor of her achievements in her educational and social work. She had founded over twenty education and care facilities for children in Anin, Białołęka, Chotomów, Międzylesie, Płudy, Sejny, Wilno and others.

Activity during World War II
From the beginning of the war the Franciscan Sisters of the Family of Mary, “in the spirit of Christian love and Franciscan joy,” brought aid to those in need, both civilians and members of the Polish underground. Sisters arranged work, provided shelter and distributed false documents. During the Warsaw Uprising in the provincial house at Hoża St. 53, the sisters ran a paramedical station and a soup kitchen, later turned into a hospital.

Mother Matylda Getter declared that she would take in every Jewish child she could. During the occupation, the Order's Sisters rescued between 250 and 550 Jewish children from the ghetto. Mother Matylda risked her life and the lives of her Sisters by taking the children into her orphanages and hiring adults to work with them, caring for the children in facilities scattered around Poland. As the superior of the Warsaw Province of the Franciscan Sisters of the Family of Mary, she took on the responsibility of obtaining birth certificates for the children and hiding them in the order’s educational institutions.

Bibliography
 Mordecai Paldiel "Churches and the Holocaust: unholy teaching, good samaritans, and reconciliation" p. 209-210, KTAV Publishing House, Inc., 2006, 
 „Siostry Zakonne w Polsce. Słownik biograficzny”, t. 1, p. 93.,
 "Kościół katolicki na ziemiach Polski w czasie II wojny światowej", t. XI, Warszawa 1981
 "Siostry Rodziny Maryi z pomocą dzieciom polskim i żydowskim w Międzylesiu i Aninie", Biblioteka Wawerska, Warszawa 2006,
 "Za cenę życia", "Ład", Warszawa, 1983 nr 17 1983,
 "Wspomnienie... o Matce Matyldzie Getter "Matusia", "Słowo Powszechne", 1968, nr 35

References

External links
 Artykuł na temat akcji ratowania Żydów przez siostry franciszkanki na stronach Radia Maryja
 Spotkanie ocalonych z siostrami franciszkankami po 60 latach
 Polscy Sprawiedliwi - Przywracanie Pamięci; Muzeum Historii Żydów Polskich
 Matylda Getter – her activity to save Jews' lives at the Holocaust, at Yad Vashem website

1870 births
1968 deaths
Nuns from Warsaw
Catholic Righteous Among the Nations
Polish humanitarians
Women humanitarians
Polish resistance members of World War II
Polish Righteous Among the Nations
Polish Roman Catholics
Franciscan nuns
20th-century Polish Roman Catholic nuns